Welcome to the Beautiful South is the debut album by English band The Beautiful South, released in October 1989 by Go! Discs and the next year in the United States by Elektra Records. Three singles were released from the album, which became top 40 hits in the United Kingdom: "Song for Whoever" (#1), "You Keep It All In" (#8) and "I'll Sail This Ship Alone" (#31).

The original album cover depicted two pictures by Jan Saudek, one of a woman with a gun in her mouth, and another with a man smoking. Woolworths refused to stock the album, in the words of the band, to "prevent the hoards [sic] of impressionable young fans from blowing their heads off in a gun-gobbling frenzy, or taking up smoking"; An alternative cover featuring a picture of a stuffed toy rabbit and a teddy bear was therefore made.  A second alternative cover was also prepared for the Canadian edition of the album; this version omitted the picture of the woman, and featured only the smoking man.

NME included it in their "Top 100 Albums You've Never Heard" list in 2012.

Track listing
All songs written by Paul Heaton and Dave Rotheray, except where noted.

"Song for Whoever" – 6:10
"Have You Ever Been Away?" – 5:12
"From Under the Covers" – 4:05
"I'll Sail This Ship Alone" – 4:41
"Girlfriend"  – 2:54
"Straight in at 37" – 4:29 (cassette and CD bonus track)
"You Keep It All In" – 2:54
"Woman in the Wall" – 5:16
"Oh Blackpool" – 3:01
"Love Is..." – 7:04
"I Love You (But You're Boring)" – 4:31

2004 Japanese reissue bonus tracks
"You and Your Big Ideas"
"You Just Can't Smile It Away" 
"It's Instrumental"
"But 'Til Then"
"I'll Sail This Ship Alone" (Orchestral Mix)

Non-LP/CD B-Sides
As what was to become their usual modus operandi, Welcome to The Beautiful South included unreleased material on the B-sides of the singles taken from their albums.

from the "Song for Whoever" 12" single and CDEP
"Song for Whoever"
"Straight in at 37"
"You and Your Big Ideas"

from the "You Keep It All In" 12" single and CDEP
"You Keep It All In" 
"You Just Can't Smile It Away" (Bill Withers)
"I Love You (But You're Boring)" 
"It's Instrumental"

from the "I'll Sail This Ship Alone" 12" single and CDEP
"I'll Sail This Ship Alone" (single mix)
"I'll Sail This Ship Alone" (LP Mix )
"But 'Til Then" 
"I'll Sail This Ship Alone" (Orchestral Mix )

Personnel
The Beautiful South
Paul Heaton – vocals
Dave Hemingway – vocals
Dave Rotheray – guitar
Sean Welch – bass
Dave Stead – drums

Additional personnel
Briana Corrigan – vocals
Pete Wingfield – keyboards, piano
Mel Wesson – keyboards, drum programs
Martin Ditcham – percussion
Peter Thoms – trombone
Gary Barnacle – saxophone, flute
John Thirkell – trumpet, fluglehorn

Inside sleeve photography 
John Woods

References

1989 debut albums
The Beautiful South albums
Albums produced by Mike Hedges
Go! Discs albums